is the Japanese fifth tier of league football, which is part of the Japanese Regional Leagues. It covers most of the Tōhoku region and the 6 prefectures of Akita, Aomori, Fukushima, Iwate, Miyagi and Yamagata. It is one of the nine Japanese Regional Leagues, the fifth and sixth league levels in the Japanese association football league system.

Division 2 is divided into North 
(Akita, Aomori and Iwate Prefectures) and South (Fukushima, Miyagi and Yamagata Prefectures) divisions.

2023 clubs 
Division 1

Division 2 North

Division 2 South

Tohoku Soccer League 1st Division Champions

Venues in Tohoku

References

Tohoku Soccer League official website

Football leagues in Japan
Sports leagues established in 1977